Wellington Gonçalves Amorim (born January 23, 1977), called as Wellington Amorim, is a Brazilian football striker.

Career
His previous clubs include Villa Nova-MG, Atlético Mineiro, América-MG, Sport Recife, Ipatinga-MG, Marília-SP, Pohang Steelers in South Korea, São Caetano-SP, Figueirense-SC, Guaratinguetá-SP, Ceará, Mirassol and Fortaleza.

External links

 
CBF 

1977 births
Living people
Footballers from Belo Horizonte
Brazilian footballers
Villa Nova Atlético Clube players
Clube Atlético Mineiro players
América Futebol Clube (MG) players
Sport Club do Recife players
Ipatinga Futebol Clube players
Marília Atlético Clube players
Pohang Steelers players
K League 1 players
Associação Desportiva São Caetano players
Figueirense FC players
Fortaleza Esporte Clube players
Mirassol Futebol Clube players
Ceará Sporting Club players
Brazilian expatriate footballers
Expatriate footballers in South Korea
Association football forwards
Brazilian expatriate sportspeople in South Korea